Bermuda participated at the 2017 Summer Universiade in Taipei, Taiwan with 3 competitors in 1 sport.

Competitors 
The following table lists Bermuda's delegation per sport and gender.

Athletics

Men

Track events

Field events

References 

Nations at the 2017 Summer Universiade
2017 in Bermudian sport